Willetts is a surname.  It may refer to: 

 Dave Willetts, British actor
 David Willetts, British politician
 Helen Willetts, BBC television weather presenter 
 Karl Willetts, member of the British band Bolt Thrower 
 Michael Willetts (1943–1971), British soldier, posthumous recipient of the George Cross
 Scott Willits (1895–1973), American musician and violin teacher 
 Terry Willetts (born 1939), English cricketer

See also
 Willett (disambiguation)
 Willits (disambiguation)